The Vanuatu women's national football team represents Vanuatu in international women's association football. The team is controlled by the Vanuatu Football Federation (VFF). Vanuatu's home field is the Port Vila Municipal Stadium, located in the country's capital, Port Vila. The team is managed by Job Alwin.

Vanuatu never qualified for a FIFA Women's World Cup, but competed in the 2010 OFC Women's Championship, hosted by New Zealand during September–October 2010. The team also participated in the 2003 South Pacific Games football tournament. Vanuatu also competed in the 2022 OFC Women's Nations Cup.

Currently, their FIFA ranking position is the 104th. Vanuatu's highest ever ranking was 82, in 2004 and their worst ranking was 148 in September 2015.

History
Vanuatu's first match was played in Nausori, Fiji at the Ratu Cakobau Park on 30 June 2003, against Tonga, who also played its first match. Tonga won the match, despite losing 2–1 at the end of the first half. Five days later, Vanuatu achieved a draw with Papua New Guinea, by 2–2. The team's biggest win was accomplished against Kiribati by 11–0 another five days later. Lavinia Taga scored seven goals for Vanuatu. In the other games, Fiji, Guam and Tahiti defeated the Vanuatuans.

The team was expected to participate in the 2003 and 2007 OFC Women's Championships, but ultimately withdrew from both.

After seven years of inactivity, Vanuatu returned to the international competition in the 2010 OFC Women's Championship in New Zealand. With only one goal, scored by midfielder Stephanie Tougen, the team finished last in the Group A table, after losing all of its games against the Cook Islands, New Zealand and Tahiti.

Vanuatu failed to qualify for the 2012 Olympics tournament, due to its poor performance in the qualifiers. Nevertheless, the team managed to achieve a second victory, with Samoa.

Results and fixtures

The following is a list of match results in the last 12 months, as well as any future matches that have been scheduled.

Legend

2022

Head-to-head record

Coaching staff

Managerial history

Players

Current squad
The following players were called up for the 2 friendly games against Singapore and Fiji and for the 2019 Pacific Games from 7–20 July in Apia, Samoa.

Caps and goals as of 18 July 2019, after the game against Tahiti.

Competitive record

FIFA Women's World Cup

Olympic Games

OFC Women's Nations Cup

Pacific Games

Pacific Mini Games

See also

Sport in Vanuatu
Football in Vanuatu
Women's football in Vanuatu
Vanuatu men's national football team

References

Oceanian women's national association football teams
W